The 1991 USC Trojans football team represented the University of Southern California (USC) in the 1991 NCAA Division I-A football season. In their fifth year under head coach Larry Smith, the Trojans compiled a 3–8 record (2–6 against conference opponents), finished in eighth place in the Pacific-10 Conference (Pac-10), and were outscored by their opponents by a combined total of 276 to 229.

Quarterback Reggie Perry led the team in passing, completing 131 of 255 passes for 1,574 yards with three touchdowns and 12 interceptions.  Deon Strother led the team in rushing with 129 carries for 614 yards and seven touchdowns. Johnnie Morton led the team in receiving with 49 catches for 662 yards and no touchdowns.

Schedule

Roster

References

USC
USC Trojans football seasons
USC Trojans football